() are the districts of Ireland, individually or collectively, where the Irish government recognises that the Irish language is the predominant vernacular, or language of the home.
The Gaeltacht districts were first officially recognised during the 1920s in the early years of the Irish Free State, following the Gaelic revival, as part of a government policy aimed at restoring the Irish language.

The Gaeltacht is threatened by serious language decline. Research published in 2015 showed that Irish is spoken on a daily basis by two-thirds or more of the population in only 21 of the 155 electoral divisions in the Gaeltacht. Daily language use by two-thirds or more of the population is regarded by some academics as a tipping point for language survival.

History

In 1926, the official Gaeltacht was designated as a result of the report of the first Gaeltacht Commission Coimisiún na Gaeltachta. The exact boundaries were not defined. At the time, an area was classified as Gaeltacht if 25% or more of the population was Irish-speaking; however, Gaeltacht status was also accorded to many areas that did not meet the 25% threshold. The Irish Free State recognised that there were predominantly Irish-speaking or semi-Irish-speaking districts in 15 of its 26 counties.

In the 1950s, another Gaeltacht Commission concluded that the Gaeltacht boundaries were ill-defined. It recommended that Gaeltacht status be based solely on the strength of language use in an area. In the 1950s, Gaeltacht districts were initially defined precisely and excluded many areas in which the number of Irish speakers had declined. Gaeltacht areas were recognised in seven of the state's 26 counties (nominally Donegal, Galway, Mayo, Kerry, and Waterford).

The Gaeltacht boundaries have not officially been altered since then, apart from minor changes. Those changes were: The inclusion of An Clochán (Cloghane) and Cé Bhréanainn (Brandon) in County Kerry in 1974; the inclusion of a part of West Muskerry in County Cork (although the Irish-speaking population had decreased markedly from what it had been before the 1950s); and the inclusion of Baile Ghib (Gibstown) and Ráth Chairn (Rathcarran) in Meath in 1967.

21st century

A study in 2005 by An Chomhairle um Oideachas Gaeltachta agus Gaelscolaíochta (The Educational Council for Gaeltacht and Irish-Medium Schools, which was established in 2002 under the Education Act 1998) said that Gaeltacht schools were facing a crisis. It forecast that, without support, few of them would be teaching in Irish in 20 years' time. This would threaten the future of the Gaeltacht.  Parents felt that the educational system did not support their efforts to pass on Irish as a living language to their children. The study added that a significant number of Gaeltacht schools had switched to teaching in English, and others were wavering.

In 2002 the third Coimisiún na Gaeltachta stated in its report that the erosion of the use of Irish in the Gaeltacht was now such that it was only a matter of time before the Gaeltacht disappeared. In some areas, Irish had already ceased to be a community language. Even in the strongest Gaeltacht areas, current patterns of bilingualism were leading to the dominance of English. Policies implemented by the State and voluntary groups were having no effect.

The report recommended that a new language reinforcement strategy was required, one that had the confidence of the community itself. The Commission recommended, among many other things, that the boundaries of the official Gaeltacht should be redrawn. It also recommended a comprehensive linguistic study to assess the vitality of the Irish language in the remaining Gaeltacht districts.

The study was undertaken by Acadamh na hOllscolaíochta Gaeilge (part of the National University of Ireland, Galway). On 1 November 2007 Staidéar Cuimsitheach Teangeolaíoch ar Úsáid na Gaeilge sa Ghaeltacht ("A Comprehensive Linguistic Study of the Usage of Irish in the Gaeltacht") was published.

Concerning Gaeltacht boundaries, it suggested creating three linguistic zones within the Gaeltacht region:

 A – more than 67% daily Irish speaking – Irish dominant as the community language
 B – 44%–66% daily Irish speaking – English dominant, with large Irish-speaking minority
 C – less than 44% daily Irish speaking – English dominant, but with Irish-speaking minority much higher than the national average of Irish speaking

The report suggested that Category A districts should be the State's priority in providing services through Irish and development schemes. It also said that Category C areas that showed a further decline in the use of Irish should lose their Gaeltacht status.

The 2006 Census data shows that of the 95,000 people living within the official Gaeltacht, approximately 17,000 belonged to Category A areas, 10,000 to Category B, and 17,000 to Category C, leaving about 50,000 in Gaeltacht areas that did not meet the minimum criteria. In response to this situation, the government introduced the Gaeltacht Bill 2012. Its stated aim was to provide for a new definition of boundaries based on language criteria, but it was criticised for doing the opposite of this.

Critics drew attention to Section 7 of the Bill, which stated that all areas "currently within the Gaeltacht" would maintain their current Gaeltacht status, regardless of whether Irish was used. This status could only be revoked if the area failed to prepare a language plan (with no necessary relationship to the documented number of speakers). The Bill was also criticised for placing all responsibility for the maintenance of Irish on voluntary organisations, with no increase in government resources.

The annual report in 2012 by the Language Commissioner for Irish reinforced these criticisms by emphasising the failure of the State to provide Irish-language services to Irish speakers in the Gaeltacht and elsewhere. The report said that Irish in the Gaeltacht was now at its most fragile and that the State could not expect that Irish would survive as a community language if the State kept forcing the use of English on Gaeltacht communities.

A report published in 2015, Nuashonrú ar an Staidéar Cuimsitheach Teangeolaíoch ar Úsáid na Gaeilge sa Ghaeltacht: 2006–2011, said that on present indicators, Irish will cease to be used as a community language in the Gaeltacht within ten years.

Administration

The Department of Tourism, Culture, Arts, Gaeltacht, Sport and Media, under the leadership of the Minister for Tourism, Culture, Arts, Gaeltacht, Sport and Media, is responsible for the overall Irish Government policy with respect to the Gaeltacht, and supervises the work of the Údarás na Gaeltachta and other bodies. RTÉ Raidió na Gaeltachta is the Raidió Teilifís Éireann (RTÉ) radio station serving the Gaeltacht and Irish speakers generally. TG4 is the television station which is focused on promoting the Irish language and is based in the County Galway Gaeltacht.

In March 2005, Minister for Community, Rural and Gaeltacht Affairs Éamon Ó Cuív announced that the government of Ireland would begin listing only the Irish language versions of place names in the Gaeltachtaí as the official names, stripping the official Ordnance Survey of their English equivalents, to bring them up to date with road signs in the Gaeltacht, which have been in Irish only since 1970. This was done under a Placenames Order made under the Official Languages Act.

Gaeltachtaí in the Republic of Ireland

Demographics

At the time of the 2006 census of the Republic of Ireland, the population of the Gaeltacht was 91,862, approximately 2.1% of the state's 4,239,848 people, with major concentrations of Irish speakers located in the western counties of Donegal, Mayo, Galway, and Kerry. There were smaller concentrations in the counties of Cork and Waterford in the south and Meath in the east. The most recent census of 2016 however shows that the population of the Gaeltacht was 96,090. This shows a rise of 4.5% from 2006.

The Gaeltacht districts have historically suffered from mass emigration. Being at the edge of the island they always had fewer railways and roads, and poorer land to farm. Other influences have been the arrival of non-Irish speaking families, the marginal role of the Irish language in the education system and general pressure from the English-speaking community. There is no evidence that periods of relative prosperity have materially improved the situation of the language.

Donegal Gaeltacht
The Donegal (or Tyrconnell) Gaeltacht ( or Gaeltacht Thír Chonaill) has a population of 23,346 (Census 2016) and represents 23.4% of the total Gaeltacht population. This represents 26% of total Gaeltacht land area. The three parishes of the Rosses, Gweedore and Cloughaneely constitute the main centre of population of the Donegal Gaeltacht. There are over 17,132 Irish speakers, 14,500 in areas where it is spoken by 30–100% of the population and 2,500 in areas where it is spoken by less than 30%. In 2006 there were 2,436 people employed in a full-time capacity in Údarás na Gaeltachta client companies in the Donegal Gaeltacht. This region is particularly popular with students of the Ulster dialect; each year thousands of students visit the area from Northern Ireland. Donegal is unique in the Gaeltacht regions, as its accent and dialect is unmistakably northern in character. The language has many similarities with Scottish Gaelic, which are not evident in other Irish dialects.

Gweedore in County Donegal is the largest Gaeltacht parish in Ireland, which is home to regional studios of RTÉ Raidió na Gaeltachta. It has produced well-known traditional musicians, including the bands Altan and Clannad, as well as the artist Enya. All three have recorded music in Irish.

Galway Gaeltacht
The Galway County and Galway City Gaeltachtaí have a combined population of 50,570 (2016) and represent 50.8% of total Gaeltacht population. This represents 26% of total Gaeltacht land area.

There is also a third-level constituent college of National University of Ireland Galway (NUIG) called Acadamh na hOllscolaíochta Gaeilge in An Cheathrú Rua and Carna. The national Irish-language radio station Raidió na Gaeltachta is located in Casla, the Tuairisc online newspaper is in Barna, and the national television station TG4 is in Baile na hAbhann. Galway city is home to the Irish language theatre Taibhdhearc na Gaillimhe.

Kerry Gaeltacht
The Kerry Gaeltacht consists of two areas – the western half of Gaeltacht Corca Dhuibhne (Dingle Peninsula) and central and western parts of Iveragh Peninsula (Uíbh Ráthach). The largest settlement in Corca Dhuibhne is Dingle and the largest in Iveragh Peninsula is Ballinskelligs. The Kerry Gaeltacht has a population of 8,729 (6,185 Irish speakers) and represents 9% of total Gaeltacht population.

Mayo Gaeltacht
The Mayo Gaeltacht as of 2011 has a total population of 10,886 and represents 11.5% of the total Gaeltacht population. This represents 19% of the total Gaeltacht land area and comprises three distinct areas – Erris, Achill Island and Toormakeady. There are 6,667 Irish speakers, with 4,000 living in areas where the language is spoken by 30–100% of the population and 2,500 living in areas where it is spoken by less than 30%.

Cork Gaeltacht
The Cork Gaeltacht consists of two areas – Muskerry and Cape Clear Island. The Muskerry Gaeltacht has a population of 3,895 people (2,951 Irish speakers) and represents 4% of the total Gaeltacht population. This represents 6% of the total Gaeltacht area. The largest Muskerry settlements are the villages of Baile Mhic Íre (Ballymakeera), Baile Bhuirne (Ballyvourney) and Béal Átha an Ghaorthaidh (Ballingeary).Cill na Martra (Kilnamartyra)

Waterford Gaeltacht
The Waterford Gaeltacht (Gaeltacht na nDéise) is ten kilometres (six miles) west of Dungarvan. It embraces the parishes of Rinn Ua gCuanach (Ring) and An Sean Phobal (Old Parish). The Waterford Gaeltacht has a population of 1,784 people (1,271 Irish speakers) and represents 2% of total Gaeltacht population.

All education in Gaeltacht na nDéise is carried out through the medium of Irish. There are two Pre-schools, two Primary level national schools, one Secondary School, Meánscoil San Nioclás and Coláiste na Rinne, a private boarding school and summer college. Gaeltacht na nDéise was one of the few Gaeltacht areas in which the percentage of daily Irish speakers increased in the recent updated comprehensive linguistic survey of the Gaeltacht.

Meath Gaeltacht
The Meath Gaeltacht is the smallest Gaeltacht area and consists of the two villages of Ráth Cairn and Baile Ghib. Navan,  from Baile Ghib, is the main urban centre within the region, with a population of more than 20,000. The Meath Gaeltacht has a population of 1,771 and represents 2% of the total Gaeltacht population. This represents 1% of the total Gaeltacht land area.

The Meath Gaeltacht has a history quite different from that of the country's other Irish speaking regions. The Ráth Cairn Gaeltacht was founded in 1935 when 41 families from Connemara in West Galway were resettled on land previously acquired by the Irish Land Commission. Each was given  to farm. Baile Ghib (formerly Gibbstown) was settled in the same way in 1937, along with Baile Ailin (formerly Allenstown). In the early years, a large percentage of the population returned to Galway or emigrated, but enough Irish speakers remained to ensure that Ráth Cairn and Baile Ghib were awarded Gaeltacht status in 1967. The original aim of spreading the Irish language into the local community met with no success, and the colonists had to become bilingual.

Revival and innovation

There are areas of Ireland, north and south, where an attempt is being made to re-establish Irish-speaking communities, with varying levels of success. Such areas are both urban and rural. Most daily speakers of Irish now live outside the existing Gaeltacht areas, and are particularly numerous in Dublin. In 2018 Foras na Gaeilge announced that Carn Tóchair in County Londonderry was going to be one of the first five Líonraí Gaeilge (areas with Irish-speaking networks) on the island of Ireland, along with Belfast, Loughrea in County Galway, Ennis in County Clare, and Clondalkin in Dublin.

Dublin
Dublin and its suburbs are reported to be the site of the largest number of daily Irish speakers, with 14,229 persons speaking Irish daily, representing 18 per cent of all daily speakers. In a survey of a small sample of adults who had grown up in Dublin and had completed full-time education, 54% of respondents reported some fluency in Irish, ranging from being able to make small talk to complete fluency. Only 19% of speakers spoke Irish three or more times per week, with a plurality (43%) speaking Irish less than once a fortnight.

There is an Irish-language centre Áras Chrónáin in Clondalkin and an Irish language GAA club Na Gaeil Óga CLG based in Lucan and the Phoenix Park.

County Dublin has over 50 Gaelscoileanna including 10  Gaelcholáistí.

Northern Ireland
In 2001, the British government ratified the European Charter for Regional or Minority Languages. Irish (in Northern Ireland) was specified under Part III of the Charter, giving it a status comparable to that of the Welsh language or Scottish Gaelic. This included undertakings in relation to education, translation of statutes, interaction with public authorities, the use of placenames, media access, support for cultural activities and other matters. Compliance with the state's obligations is assessed periodically by a Committee of Experts of the Council of Europe.

A language revival has also taken place in southern County Londonderry, centred on Slaghtneill (Sleacht Néill) and Carntogher (Carn Tóchair), both outside Maghera.

West Clare
Parts of County Clare were recognised as Gaeltacht areas following recommendations made by Coimisiún na Gaeltachta 1925. In 1956, however, it was decided that there were too few traditional speakers to justify the inclusion of Clare in the Official Gaeltacht. Since then there have been attempts to re-establish the language in the community, and it was claimed in 2012 that there were up to 170 people in County Clare who were daily speakers of Irish. The main activist group is Coiste Forbartha Gaeltachta Chontae an Chláir (The Gaeltacht Development Committee for County Clare), whose aim is to achieve Gaeltacht status for County Clare or for part of it.

North America
The Permanent North American Gaeltacht is an area in Tamworth, Ontario in Canada. It has no permanent residents but serves as a resource centre for Irish speakers throughout North America. It was officially opened in 2007.

Irish colleges
Irish colleges are residential Irish language summer courses that give students the opportunity to be totally immersed in the language, usually for periods of three weeks over the summer months. During these courses, students attend classes and participate in a variety of different activities games, music, art and sport. There are a number of different Irish colleges for students to choose from throughout the country. Many of the colleges while providing a number of activities and events for young people through the Irish language will be known for or specialise in a specific category. For example, Coláiste Lurgan is commonly known for its promotion of the Irish language through music, Coláiste Aodáin for water sports and team games, and others for GAA sports.

As with the conventional schools, the Department of Education sets out requirements for class sizes and qualifications required by teachers. Some courses are college-based and others provide for residence with host families in Gaeltacht areas, such as Ros Muc in Galway, Ráth Cairn in County Meath, and Teileann and Rann na Feirste in County Donegal, with instruction given by a bean an tí, or Irish-speaking landlady.
Popular Irish colleges/Gaeltachts include: Spleodar, Colaiste Sheosaimh and Uisce. Most Irish language summer colleges for teenagers in the Gaeltacht are supported and represented by CONCOS, who are based in Leitir Móir.

See also
 Ulster Irish
 Connacht Irish
 Munster Irish
 Gaeltacht Act 2012
 Údarás na Gaeltachta The Gaeltacht Authority
 CONCOS Federation of Irish language Summer colleges
 Bailte Seirbhísí Gaeltachta (Gaeltacht Service Towns)
 Líonraí Gaeilge (Irish-language Networks)
 20-Year Strategy for the Irish Language 2010–2030
 Status of the Irish language
 Gaeltarra Éireann — replaced in 1980 by Údarás na Gaeltachta
 Gàidhealtachd – equivalent region for Scottish Gaelic
 Y Fro Gymraeg – equivalent region for Welsh

References

External links
 Department of Tourism, Culture, Arts, Gaeltacht, Sport and Media
 Forsa na Gaeilge
 Údarás na Gaeltachta
 An Ghaeltacht

Irish language
Gaeltacht places
Irish words and phrases
Cultural geography
Geography of Ireland
1926 establishments in Ireland
Linguistic regions of Europe
Language geography